Shri Lalsawia is an Indian politician from Mizoram.He is the 1st Chief Executive Member(CEM)of Mizoram in the first general election held in April 1952. He also served in the Upper House of the Indian Parliament - the Rajya Sabha - from 1978 to 1984 as an independent. He has 1 son and 5 daughters.

See also
List of Rajya Sabha members from Mizoram

References

Rajya Sabha members from Mizoram
Possibly living people
Mizo people